Quink is a Dutch vocal ensemble founded in 1978.

The five singer line-up c. 1996 included Machteld Van Woerden (soprano), Kees-Jan De Koning (bass), Harry Van Berne (tenor),
Corrie Pronk (alto), Marjolein Koetsier (soprano). The four singer line up in 2012 was Marjon Strijk (soprano), Elsbeth Gerritsen (mezzo-soprano), with Harry van Berne and Kees Jan de Koning continuing as tenor and bass.

Selected discography
 Pastime with Good Company, CBS
 Benjamin Britten 1984
 Byrd, Etcetera
 Italian Renaissance Madrigals, Telarc
 Vaughan Williams, Finzi 1987, re-released Challenge 2012
 Carols Around the World. Telarc 80202, 1989
 Folksongs of the World. Telarc 1991.
 English Madrigals. Telarc 1993
 Purcell Odes Telarc
 Ain't misbehavin' Ottavo OTR C19862
 Robert Heppener, Daan Manneke, Ton de Leeuw, Huub Kerstens: Invisible Cities - modern compositions by Dutch composers. Telarc 1996
 Rossini Petit messe solennelle Challenge
 A un niño llorand - Challenge Classics
 Juan Vásquez: Gentil Señora Mia, 16th Century Songs and Villancicos. Brilliant Classics, 2013

References

External links
Homepage

Early music groups